Priscilla Lopes-Schliep (born 26 August 1982) is a Canadian retired hurdler in track and field athletic competition. She was born in Scarborough, Ontario, and currently lives in Whitby.

Personal

Born in Scarborough, Ontario, Lopes-Schliep's heritage is Guyanese and Portuguese. She is the first cousin of soccer player Dwayne De Rosario.

Lopes-Schliep attended the University of Nebraska–Lincoln. She married former University of Nebraska basketball player Bronsen Schliep in the fall of 2007. They currently reside in Toronto, where he practices dentistry.

Career
In 2004 Priscilla became the 2004 NCAA Indoor Champion in the 60 meter hurdles with a time of 7.82 as her personal best. Lopes-Schliep won a bronze medal at the 2008 Summer Olympics in women's 100 m hurdles. It was the first medal for Canada in Athletics at the Summer Olympics since the 1996 Games and the first medal for a Canadian woman in Olympic track and field since the 1992 Games.

At the 2009 World Championships in Athletics, Lopes-Schliep won a silver medal in the 100 m hurdles in Berlin, Germany, in a time of 12.54s. She failed to qualify for the 2012 London Olympics, having finished 7th in the 100m hurdles at the 2012 Canadian Olympic trials for track and field after she struck a hurdle and fell.

Genetics

Lopes-Schliep has the LMNA R482W gene mutation, and was diagnosed with Dunnigan-type Lipodystrophy. The diagnosis came from DIY research conducted by Jill Viles, an Iowa mother without any medical training but who had Emery–Dreifuss muscular dystrophy and who spotted physical similarities between herself and Lopes-Schliep, and encouraged her to undergo genetic testing. The results confirmed Dunnigan-type Lipodystrophy, and alerted Lopes-Schliep to a potential pancreatitis attack due to the high levels of fat in her blood, though this was avoided by modifying her diet.

Personal bests

All information taken from IAAF profile.

References

External links
 Official website
 
 
 
 
 

1982 births
Living people
Athletes from Toronto
Canadian female hurdlers
Sportspeople from Scarborough, Toronto
Olympic track and field athletes of Canada
Olympic bronze medalists for Canada
Athletes (track and field) at the 2004 Summer Olympics
Athletes (track and field) at the 2008 Summer Olympics
University of Nebraska alumni
Canadian sportspeople of Guyanese descent
Canadian people of Portuguese descent
World Athletics Championships medalists
Medalists at the 2008 Summer Olympics
World Athletics Championships athletes for Canada
Olympic bronze medalists in athletics (track and field)
Diamond League winners